The Greenberger–Horne–Zeilinger experiment or GHZ experiments are a class of physics experiments that may be used to generate starkly contrasting predictions from local hidden-variable theory and quantum mechanical theory, and permit immediate comparison with actual experimental results. A GHZ experiment is similar to a test of Bell's inequality, except using three or more entangled particles, rather than two. With specific settings of GHZ experiments, it is possible to demonstrate absolute contradictions between the predictions of local hidden variable theory and those of quantum mechanics, whereas tests of Bell's inequality only demonstrate contradictions of a statistical nature. The results of actual GHZ experiments agree with the predictions of quantum mechanics.

The GHZ experiments are named for Daniel M. Greenberger, Michael A. Horne, and Anton Zeilinger (GHZ) who first analyzed certain measurements involving four observers and who subsequently (together with Abner Shimony (GHSZ), upon a suggestion by David Mermin) applied their arguments to certain measurements involving three observers.

Summary description and example

A GHZ experiment is performed using a quantum system in a Greenberger–Horne–Zeilinger state.  An example of a GHZ state is three photons in an entangled state, with the photons being in a superposition of being all horizontally polarized (HHH) or all vertically polarized (VVV), with respect to some coordinate system. The GHZ state can be written in bra–ket notation as

Prior to any measurements being made, the polarizations of the photons are indeterminate; If a measurement is made on one of the photons using a two-channel polarizer aligned with the axes of the coordinate system, the photon assumes either horizontal or vertical polarization, with 50% probability for each orientation, and the other two photons immediately assume the identical polarization.

In a GHZ experiment regarding photon polarization, however, a set of measurements is performed on the three entangled photons using two-channel polarizers set to various orientations relative to the coordinate system.  For specific combinations of orientations, perfect (rather than statistical) correlations between the three polarizations are predicted by both local hidden variable theory (aka "local realism") and by quantum mechanical theory, and the predictions may be contradictory.  For instance, if the polarization of two of the photons are measured and determined to be rotated +45° from horizontal, then local hidden variable theory predicts that the polarization of the third photon will be -45° from horizontal.  However, quantum mechanical theory predicts that it will also be +45° from the same axis.

The results of actual experiments agree with the predictions of quantum mechanics, not those of local realism.

Zeilinger was awarded the (shared) 2022 Nobel Prize in physics for his contributions.

Detailed technical example

Preliminary considerations

Signals are to be considered and counted only if A, B, and C detect them trial-by-trial together; i.e. for any one signal which has been detected by A in one particular trial, B must have detected precisely one signal in the same trial, and C must have detected precisely one signal in the same trial; and vice versa.

For any one particular trial it may be consequently distinguished and counted whether 

similarly, it can be distinguished and counted whether 

and correspondingly, it can be distinguished and counted whether 

For any one trial j it may be consequently distinguished in which particular channels signals were detected and counted by A, B, and C together, in this particular trial j; and correlation numbers such as

can be evaluated in each trial.

Following an argument by John Stewart Bell, each trial is now characterized by particular individual adjustable apparatus parameters, or settings of the observers involved. There are (at least) two distinguishable settings being considered for each, namely A's settings a1 , and a2 , B's settings b1 , and b2 , and C's settings c1 , and c2 .

Trial s for instance would be characterized by A's setting a2 , B's setting b2 , and C's settings c2 ; another trial, r, would be characterized by A's setting a2 , B's setting b2 , and C's settings c1 , and so on. (Since C's settings are distinct between trials r and s, therefore these two trials are distinct.)

Further, as Greenberger, Horne, Zeilinger and collaborators demonstrate in detail, the following four distinct trials, with their various separate detector counts and with suitably identified settings, may be considered and be found experimentally:
 trial s as shown above, characterized by the settings a2 , b2 , and c2 , and with detector counts such that

 trial u with settings a2 , b1 , and c1 , and with detector counts such that

 trial v with settings a1 , b2 , and c1 , and with detector counts such that
 and
 trial w with settings a1 , b1 , and c2 , and with detector counts such that

The notion of local hidden variables is now introduced by considering the following question:

Can the individual detection outcomes and corresponding counts as obtained by any one observer, e.g. the numbers , be expressed as a function  (which necessarily assumes the values +1 or −1), i.e. as a function only of the setting of this observer in this trial, and of one other hidden parameter , but without an explicit dependence on settings or outcomes concerning the other observers (who are considered far away)?

Comparison with the product which defined  explicitly above, readily suggests to identify
 , 
  
  and  
 ,

where j denotes any one trial which is characterized by the specific settings ax , bx , and cx , of A, B, and of C, respectively.

However, GHZ and collaborators also require that the hidden variable argument to functions A(), B(), and C() may take the same value, even in distinct trials, being characterized by distinct experimental contexts. This is the statistical independence assumption (also assumed in Bell's theorem and commonly known as "free will" assumption).

Consequently, substituting these functions into the consistent conditions on four distinct trials, u, v, w, and s shown above, they are able to obtain the following four equations concerning one and the same value :
 
 
  and
 

Taking the product of the last three equations, and noting that
, 
, and
, yields

in contradiction to the first equation; .

Given that the four trials under consideration can indeed be consistently considered and experimentally realized, the assumptions concerning hidden variables which lead to the indicated mathematical contradiction are therefore collectively unsuitable to represent all experimental results; namely the assumption of local hidden variables which occur equally in distinct trials.

Deriving an inequality

Since equations (1) through (4) above cannot be satisfied simultaneously when the hidden variable, takes the same value in each equation, GHSZ proceed by allowing  to take different values in each equation. They define
 : the set of all s such that equation (1) holds,
 : the set of all s such that equation (2) holds,
: the set of all s such that equation (3) holds,
 : the set of all s such that equation (4) holds.

Now, equation (1) can only be true if at least one of the other three is false. Therefore,

In terms of probability,

By the rules of probability theory, it follows that

This inequality allows for an experimental test.

Testing the inequality

To test the inequality just derived, GHSZ need to make one more assumption, the "fair sampling" assumption. Because of inefficiencies in real detectors, in some trials of the experiment only one or two particles of the triple will be detected. Fair sampling assumes that these inefficiencies are unrelated to the hidden variables; in other words, the number of triples actually detected in any run of the experiment is proportional to the number that would have been detected if the apparatus had no inefficiencies – with the same constant of proportionality for all possible settings of the apparatus. With this assumption,  can be determined by choosing the apparatus settings a2, b2, and c2, counting the number of triples for which the outcome is −1, and dividing by the total number of triples observed at that setting. The other probabilities can be determined in a similar manner, using , allowing a direct experimental test of the inequality.

GHSZ also show that the fair sampling assumption can be dispensed with if the detector efficiencies are at least 90.8%.

References

Quantum measurement